Ornarantia laciniosella is a moth in the family Choreutidae. It was described by August Busck in 1914. It is found in Panama.

References

Natural History Museum Lepidoptera generic names catalog

Choreutidae
Moths described in 1914